Multicilia is a flagellated genus of Amoebozoa.

It includes the species Multicilia marina.

References 

Amoebozoa genera